The Los Angeles Film Critics Association Award for Best Foreign Language Film is an award given annually by the Los Angeles Film Critics Association. It was first introduced in 1975 to reward an outstanding film not in the English language.

Winners

1970s

1980s

1990s

2000s

2010s

2020s

Multiple winners 
5 director has won the award multiple times.

References

Los Angeles Film Critics Association Awards
Film awards for Best Foreign Language Film